Heliocheilus eodora is a moth in the family Noctuidae. It is found in the Australian Capital Territory, New South Wales, the Northern Territory, Queensland, South Australia and Western Australia.

Larvae have been recorded on the seedheads of Eulalia aurea.

External links
Australian Caterpillars
Australian Faunal Directory

Heliocheilus
Moths of Australia